A trapeze is a piece of equipment for performing aerial acrobatics.

It may also refer to:
 Trapeze (film), a 1956 movie directed by Carol Reed
 Trapeze (band), a 1970s UK rock band
 Trapeze (1970 album), the band's debut album
 Trapeze (1976 album), another eponymous album by the same band
 Trapeze (book), a 2012 novel by Simon Mawer, originally published as The Girl Who Fell from the Sky
 Trapeze (Prokofiev), a ballet by Prokofiev
 Trapeze (sailing), a wire on a sailing dinghy allowing members of the crew to lean out of the boat
 Trapeze Software, a Toronto-based company specializing in software relating to public transit and paratransit systems
 Decompression trapeze, a device used in recreational diving
 Trapeze, the Oak Park and River Forest High School newspaper
 Trapeze or Kūchū Buranko, a Japanese short novel and associated works
 Trapeze, an imprint of Orion Publishing Group
 Trapeze dress, alternate term for A-line (clothing)

See also
  Trapezoid or trapezium, a four-sided figure with at least one pair of parallel sides.